Assia El Hannouni (born May 30, 1981 in Dijon) is a French track and field athlete who specialises in the 800 metres Paralympic sprint. She has Retinitis pigmentosa which means that she is almost blind, with less than one tenth vision in her left eye, and zero in her right eye. She also runs against athletes without disabilities, in 800m sprint events.

Representing her country at the 2004 Summer Paralympics in Athens, she won four gold medals, winning the 100m, 200m, 400m and 800m sprints, and breaking the world record in each event.

She represented France again at the 2008 Summer Paralympics in Beijing, and was the country's flagbearer during the Games' opening ceremony. She won silver in the 800m sprint (T13/12) with a time of 2’4’’96, before winning silver in the 1500m, and gold in both the 200m and 400m sprints.

In 2007, she set a new world record in the women's 800 metre sprint in her disability category, with a time of 2’6’’76. The same year, she competed against non-disabled athletes in the 800 metres at the French national indoors championships, finishing fifth.

As of 2007, El Hannouni is studying journalism at the Institut national du sport et de l'éducation physique (National Institute of Sport and Physical Education).

References

External links
 
 
 

Living people
Paralympic athletes of France
Athletes (track and field) at the 2004 Summer Paralympics
Athletes (track and field) at the 2008 Summer Paralympics
Athletes (track and field) at the 2012 Summer Paralympics
Paralympic gold medalists for France
Paralympic silver medalists for France
1981 births
Chevaliers of the Légion d'honneur
Visually impaired category Paralympic competitors
World record holders in Paralympic athletics
Medalists at the 2004 Summer Paralympics
Medalists at the 2008 Summer Paralympics
Medalists at the 2012 Summer Paralympics
Sportspeople from Dijon
Paralympic medalists in athletics (track and field)
French female sprinters
French female middle-distance runners
21st-century French women
French blind people